The Miss Perú 2004 pageant was held on April 19, 2004. Twenty candidates competed for the national crown. The winners represented Peru at the Miss Universe 2004, and Miss World 2004, respectively. The rest of the finalists go to different pageants.

Placements

Special Awards

 Best Regional Costume - Lambayeque - Diana Falla
 Miss Photogenic - Trujillo - María Julia Mantilla
 Miss Elegance - Tumbes - Silvana Benavides
 Miss Body - Pasco - Liesel Holler
 Best Hair - La Libertad - Lucía Alva Espinoza
 Miss Congeniality - Ucayali - Cinthy Llempen
 Most Beautiful Face - Trujillo - María Julia Mantilla
 Best Smile - Pasco - Liesel Holler
 Miss Internet - Trujillo - María Julia Mantilla

Delegates

Amazonas - Fiorella Ursula Castellano Romero
Áncash - Leslie  Stuart Corzo
Arequipa - Pamela Carolyne Chávez Aguirre
Ayacucho - Yanella Aneth Aguilar Pieri
Cajamarca - Marianella Cáceres Campos
Callao - Andrea Ines Mass
Cuzco - Angela Herrera Gustavino
Distrito Capital - Bárbara Orneasa Casallo Rubio
Junín - Tatiana Andreina Miranda Baptista
La Libertad - Lucía Alva Espinoza

Lambayeque - Diana Falla Valdiviezo
Loreto - Blanca Maria Llerena Reategui
Moquegua - Pierina Calderón Augusto
Pasco - Liesel Holler
Piura - Fiorella Lizarzaburu Ostos
San Martín - Paola Marissa Merea Ortiz
Tacna - Silvia Maldonado Angulo
Trujillo - María Julia Mantilla
Tumbes - Silvana Benavides Arce
Ucayali - Cinthy Llempen Lorenzini

Music & Special Guests Singers

Opening Show – Diana King - "Say A Little Prayer"
Swimsuit Competition – Bond - "Fuego"
Evening Gown Competition – Yanni - "Aria"
Luis Jara - "No sé Olvidarte"

References

External links
http://www.perumodelos.com/missperu2004/finalistas.htm
http://www.perumodelos.com/missperu2004/
http://www.bellezavenezolana.net/news/2004/Abril/20040419.htm
http://www.bellezavenezolana.net/news/2004/Abril/20040420.htm

Miss Peru
2004 in Peru
2004 beauty pageants